is a school of Pure Land Buddhism that focuses on the ritual recitation of the Nembutsu (or Nianfo), the name of the Amitabha Buddha.

Followers believe this recitation benefits not just the speaker, but the entire world as well. The sect began in the twelfth century when a Tendai monk named Ryōnin (良忍, 1072–1132) wrote commentary on rituals and hymns in practice at the time and founded the school.

The distinction of this Pure Land sect lies in its emphasis on the nature of interconnectedness amongst phenomena. The recitation of the nembutsu was not merely an individual quest for salvation in the Pure Land.  A practitioner's chants of nembutsu benefitted everybody else and everybody else's chants of nembutsu benefitted the solo practitioner.

Notes

References

Encyclopædia Britannica entry

Pure Land Buddhism